Houda is a surname (alternate spellings include Hoda and Huda). Notable people with that name include:

Doug Houda (born 1966), Canadian hockey player
Fatima Houda-Pepin (born 1951), Canadian politician
Nour El Houda Bouregua (born 1992), Algerian volleyball player
Nour El-Houda Ettaieb (born 1996), Tunisian rower
Sayed Houda (1900 - ??), Egyptian footballer
Simona Houda-Šaturová, Slovak classical soprano

See also

Hoda (surname)
Huda (surname)